Joel D. M. Ford (born January 16, 1969) is an American politician who served in the North Carolina Senate from the 38th district from 2013 until 2019. In 2021, he became a member of the University of North Carolina (UNC) Board of Governors.

References

External links

1969 births
Living people
Democratic Party North Carolina state senators